"Bubble" is a song recorded by Hong Kong singer-songwriter G.E.M. released on 14 October 2012. This is the fifth single from the album, Xposed. This is one of her notable work as she performed in I Am a Singer (season 2). It streamed over 100 million times in Xiami music and over 50 million views on YouTube.

Background 
In an interview, she said it was written after her breakup. She felt depressed and tried to run away, so she flew to New York City and stayed for a week. One day, she walked in a very crowded street and saw the clown blowing bubbles. It is a very beautiful scene but in her eyes, although bubble was beautiful, it was fragile. She metaphors bubble to lies, beautiful but fragile, and when it exposed, it hurts so deep. This is how her come up with the song.

Critical response 
The song started with lower key which likes telling the fragility of love and commitment; and the powerful part sounds like she had seen through the bubble-like love and starts a new life.

Music video 
Personnel
 Director: Tan Chang 
Views

 Last updated: April 12, 2019

Performances 
With "Bubble" being one of G.E.M.'s most popular and acclaimed songs, she has performed it several times, such as on the first episode of I Am a Singer (season 2) and on her world tours.

References 

G.E.M. songs
2012 songs